The Reghiu is a left tributary of the river Milcov in Romania. It flows into the Milcov in the village Reghiu.

References

Rivers of Romania
Rivers of Vrancea County